is Misia's 9th single overall and first with Rhythmedia Tribe. It was released on January 30, 2002. It peaked at #3 selling 86,780 copies on its first week. The song served as opening theme to NHK's Salt Lake City Olympics TV report. Jane Zhang's recorded the Chinese version of this song (我的路) in her third album, Jane@Music. Sarah Geronimo has an English version of the song entitled "Love Can't Lie," on her album Sweet Sixteen.

Track list

Charts

External links
https://web.archive.org/web/20061117164950/http://www.rhythmedia.co.jp/misia/disc/ — Misia discography

2002 singles
Misia songs
2002 songs
Songs written by Misia